The Harvesters, earlier The International Harvesters is a Swedish alternative country music band signed to the Atenzia Records (AB) label.

Their debut album All Kinds of Beautiful was released in January 2012, entering at No. 7 on the Swedish Albums Chart in its first week of release (week 3, dated 20 January 2012).

Members
Anders
Jerker
Henkan
Stefan
Fredrik

Awards
In 2009, they won Best Alternative Country Band at the Country-SM Awards in Sweden.

Discography

Albums

References

External links
Official website
Myspace

Swedish alternative country groups
Atenzia Records artists